The North Seventh Street Historic Residential District, in Grand Junction, Colorado, is a  historic district which was listed on the National Register of Historic Places in 1984.  It included 27 contributing buildings.

It includes the Lowell School (1925), at 310 North Seventh Street, built under the supervision of local architect Eugene Groves.

References

Historic districts on the National Register of Historic Places in Colorado
National Register of Historic Places in Mesa County, Colorado
Mission Revival architecture in Colorado
Buildings and structures completed in 1893